Abumohor is a surname. Notable people with the surname include:

Carlos Abumohor (1921–2010), Chilean businessman
Ricardo Abumohor (born 1942), Chilean businessman

Arabic-language surnames
Surnames of Chilean origin
Surnames of Palestinian origin